is a train station in the city of Toyota, Aichi Prefecture, Japan, operated by Meitetsu.

Lines

Station layout
The station has two opposed side platforms, with the station building constructed underneath. The station has automated ticket machines, Manaca automated turnstiles and is unattended.

Platforms

Adjacent stations

|-
!colspan=5|Nagoya Railroad

Station history
Kami Toyota Station was opened on July 29, 1979. The station has been unattended since October 1, 2003.

Passenger statistics
In fiscal 2017, the station was used by an average of 3,268 passengers daily.

Surrounding area
Toyota High School
 Umetsubodai Junior High School

See also
 List of Railway Stations in Japan

References

External links

 Official web page 

Railway stations in Japan opened in 1979
Railway stations in Aichi Prefecture
Stations of Nagoya Railroad
Toyota, Aichi